Middle Plantation may refer to:

 Middle Plantation (Davidsonville, Maryland) a plantation in Maryland near the South River
 Middle Plantation (Virginia) a settlement in Virginia between the James River and York Rivers
 Treaty of Middle Plantation, a 1677 treaty signed in the settlement